Atsa may stand for:

Places

 Atsa, a village in Haddinnet municipality, Ethiopia

Acronyms ATSA
ATSA Airlines (Aero Transporte S.A.), a Peruvian airline
Association for the Treatment of Sexual Abusers, an international organisation
Aviation and Transportation Security Act, United States legislation of 2001
Army Technical Support Agency, British defence research establishment 1982-1995
Association of Togolese Students in America